Arthur Gilbert (1819–1895) was an English landscape painter

Arthur Gilbert may also refer to:
Arthur Hill Gilbert (1894–1970), American Impressionist painter
Arthur Gilbert (politician) (1879–1932), Canadian member of Parliament
Sir Arthur Gilbert (real estate developer) (1913–2001), British-born American real estate developer and philanthropist
Arthur Gilbert (triathlete) (1921–2015), English triathlon competitor